The Unforgettable Character is a 1975 Taiwanese romantic drama film directed by Chang Mei-chun and written by Chiung Yao.

Plot
After the death of her parents, Hsiao-shuang begins to live with the Chu family in Taipei, who treat her like their own child. The Chu's oldest child Shih-yao deeply loves her, but being crippled he's hesitant to confess his love. Hsiao-shuang quickly falls in love with the eloquent and charismatic wannabe writer Yu-wen, but their marriage is far from blissful. Yu-wen, an irresponsible dreamer and impractical perfectionist, fails to write anything and frequently vents his frustration on Hsiao-shuang. Hsiao-shuang tries her hardest to support him and the family even during her pregnancy. Shih-yao helps Hsiao-shuang sell her songs, but that further angers Yu-wen, now addicted to gambling. After Yu-wen forcefully grabs a cherished jade from her to gamble away, Hsiao-shuang has a miscarriage and files for divorce. Hoping to encourage him, she still promises him that she will get back with him if he comes back with a finished work. Years later, when news of Yu-wen's terminal illness reaches Hsiao-shuang, she immediately arrives at his place in southern Taiwan only to find him dying with his book already completed. After his death, Shih-yao presents Hsiao-shuang a gift, which turns out to be the jade Yu-wen lost 4 years ago. Hsiao-shuang realizes Shih-yao still loves her after all these years.

Cast
Brigitte Lin as Tu Hsiao-shuang, a beautiful and musically gifted 18-year-old orphan
Han Chiang as Chu Chih-chien, a former friend of Hsiao-shuang's late father
 as Chu Chih-chien's kind mother
Chang Ping-yu as Hsin-pei, Chu Chih-chien's wife
Ku Ming-lun as Shih-yao, Chu Chih-chien's oldest child, a 29-year-old introverted and passionate television producer
Chen Lu-shan as Shih-ching, Chu Chih-chien's second child
Chen Yu-ching as Lee Chien, Shih-ching's husband
Tien Niu as Shih-hui, Chu Chih-chien's youngest child, an outgoing and enthusiastic 19-year-old student
Yeh Ming-te as Yu-nung, Shih-hui's boyfriend
Chin Han as Lu Yu-wen, Yu-nung's pal from the military who aspires to win the Nobel Prize in Literature

Music
Zai shui yifang is a 1975 Mandarin album, released by Kolin Records (歌林). The songs on A-side are sung by Chiang Lei and those on B-side by Frankie Kao.

"Zai shui yifang", sometimes translated "On the Other Side of the Water", and "Ni zenme shuo" were later covered by other singers, including Teresa Teng in her 1980 album of a similar name.

Lyrics were written by Chiung Yao, and music was composed by Lin Chia-ching, unless otherwise. Only songs that are listed as theme songs and instrumental are heard in the film.

References

External links
 黑膠博覽會【935】在水一方......江 蕾 & 高凌風 主唱 (Zai shui yi fang) at A Jun's blog in Yahoo! Hong Kong (Chinese)
 Frankie Kao discography
 The Unforgettable Character at the Hong Kong Movie Database (Chinese version)
 The Unforgettable Character (在水一方) at the China Movie DataBase (Chinese)
 The Unforgettable Character (在水一方) at DigitalArchives.tw

1975 films
Taiwanese romance films
1970s Mandarin-language films
Films based on works by Chiung Yao
1970s romance films